Portier is a French surname meaning "porter". Notable people with the surname include:

Anthony Portier (born 1982), Belgian footballer
Michael Portier (1795–1859), American Roman Catholic bishop

See also
Le Portier, a planned ward of the Principality of Monaco.

French-language surnames